Somatina wiltshirei is a moth of the  family Geometridae. It is found in Kurdistan.

References

Moths described in 1938
Scopulini